The Friendly Giant was a children's television program that aired on CBC Television from September 30, 1958 through to March 1985. It featured three main characters: a giant named Friendly (played by Bob Homme), who lived in a huge castle, along with his puppet animal friends Rusty (a rooster who played a harp, guitar, and accordion and lived in a book bag hung by the castle window), and Jerome (a giraffe who's tawny with purple spots and pokes his head in the window). The two principal puppets of the CBC version of the show were manipulated and voiced by Rod Coneybeare. Originally in Wisconsin, they were manipulated and voiced by Ken Ohst.

Beginnings
The program started in 1953 on Madison, Wisconsin radio station WHA, a station owned by the University of Wisconsin–Madison. Shortly thereafter, the show was moved to its sister television station, WHA-TV when it went on the air in 1954. Kinescopes of these shows were distributed to a few other non-commercial stations, and some of them made it to the Canadian Broadcasting Corporation in Toronto, Ontario. At the invitation of Fred Rainsberry, the head of Children's Television at the CBC, in 1958 Bob Homme moved the show to Canada, where it became a staple show for several generations of young viewers. In the United States, National Educational Television carried both WHA and CBC versions from 1953 until 1970, when NET ceded the network to the Public Broadcasting Service (PBS).

The Friendly Giant was produced by Daniel McCarthy, who would later become the head of children's programming at the CBC.

Format

The short, 15-minute show was perhaps most famous for its opening sequence. Each episode would begin with the camera panning to the right over a detailed model of part of a village, farm, harbor, city, etc as Friendly could be heard narrating and observing the goings-on in the town below. The pan would continue until it stops at the Giant's great big  boot on the left coming into view at the edge of the town and Friendly would ask the viewers to "Look up … waaaaay up!" and the Giant would thus invite everyone to come visit his castle, telling them that he will meet them there after letting the drawbridge down and opening the front doors. The traditional tune "Early One Morning" would then be heard being played on harp and  recorder, while the camera slowly zoomed into a model of the Giant's castle, the drawbridge slowly dropped down, and the medieval doors that says "Friendly Giant" opened wide in welcome as promised. Once inside, the Friendly Giant would put out three miniature chairs in front of the fireplace for his viewers beside his feet (with only his feet and hands visible), saying, "Here we are inside, here's one little chair for one of you, and a bigger chair for two more to curl up in, and someone who likes to rock, a rocking chair in the middle." Then the camera would tilt up, as the Giant gave his iconic invitation to "Now, look up, waaaaaay up, and I'll call Rusty... Rusty?" to which he would then summon his friend, Rusty the Rooster. Typically, Jerome the Giraffe would visit, poking his head in through a high window after being whistled for by Friendly. Rusty the Rooster, who lived in a book bag hanging on the wall by the window, would emerge and produce, from the bag, books to be read and other props, some seemingly larger than could fit in the bag.

The rest of the show focused on gentle, humorous chat between Friendly, Rusty, and Jerome, followed by a story or a musical performance. When extra instrumentation was needed, a pair of otherwise silent puppet cats and raccoons and a rooster — Angie and Fiddle, the Jazz Cats and Patty and Polly, the Raccoons with recorder and bassoon and Buster, a Rooster with electric bass guitar — joined in (puppeteered by Gustáv Hársfai (Sr) and Linda Keogh (Jr).  Music for the show was composed by the show's harpist, John Duncan.

At the conclusion of a typical show, Friendly plays one verse of "Early One Morning" on his recorder, says goodbye to his friends and his viewers as he puts his miniature furniture away: "It's late. This little chair will be waiting for one of you, and a rocking chair for another who likes to rock, and a big armchair for two more to curl up in when you come again to our castle. I'll close the big front doors and pull up the drawbridge after you're gone. Goodbye. Goodbye."  His hand waves goodbye as the camera zooms out and the castle's medieval doors are closed and the drawbridge is raised. As a silvery moon with a smiling face rises into the sky, a cow jumps over it as in the nursery rhyme "Hey Diddle Diddle". Originally, other things besides the cow would appear in the sky such as a bird, Pegasus, etc. On occasion, often for episodes devoted to musical performances, episodes would take place during the night.

The shows were largely ad libbed, typically based around a one-page plot summary for each episode. This gave the show an added spontaneity uncommon to most children's shows, though the series was marked by a go-slow, gentle nature with naturalistic discussions between Friendly, Rusty, and Jerome, as though the friends were meeting and simply having a conversation as opposed to actually having a set storyline. The simple repetition of its main elements from show to show put it fundamentally at odds with the bolder, ever-changing nature of such shows as Sesame Street, but complemented Mr. Dressup, which was a similarly low-key children's series that usually aired immediately after Friendly Giant.

Throughout the 1960s and into the 1980s, The Friendly Giant was part of a block of children's programming aired by the CBC each weekday morning that included programs such as Chez Hélène, Mr. Dressup, and the Canadian edition of Sesame Street.

Cancellation
In 1984, The Friendly Giant was cancelled.  The show's replacement, Fred Penner's Place, has been referred to by some people as "the Giant Killer".  By the time The Friendly Giant ended, more than 3,000 episodes of the show had been produced.

Post-cancellation
After the show's cancellation in 1985, the show continued to air in reruns until September 1987, when the show was removed from the schedule completely to make room for new children's shows.

The star of the show, Bob Homme, was made a member of the Order of Canada in 1998. He died on May 2, 2000, at the age of 81 of prostate cancer.

Approximately 850 episodes of the show are currently held in the CBC's archive, including kinescopes of the earliest episodes.

The Friendly Giant was honoured as a Masterwork by the Audio-Visual Preservation Trust of Canada in 2005.

The authorized biography of Bob Homme called Look Up — Way Up is based on interviews conducted with Bob after he retired. Links to memorable audio clips were also included.

The puppeteer of both Jerome the Giraffe and Rusty the rooster, Rod Coneybeare passed away on September 5, 2019.

Props controversy
Props, costumes and puppets from the show were on display at the CBC Museum in Toronto as part of an exhibit called Growing Up with CBC. However, The Friendly Giant paraphernalia was removed from the CBC Museum after the puppets Rusty and Jerome appeared, without permission from the Homme family, in a sketch during the 2007 Gemini Awards. Homme's daughter said that the clip was in poor taste and disrespected the memory of her father.  Only the castle wall and window on which Friendly would lean and talk to Rusty and Jerome remained in the museum until 2017.
The train set of the railway yard used in the show's intro is on display at the Pump House Steam Museum in Kingston, Ontario.

References

External links
 
 The Friendly Giant - Canadian Communication Foundation
 Authorized biography of Robert Homme called Look Up - Way Up based on interviews done with Bob after he retired.
 AVTrust.ca - The Friendly Giant (containing a video clip of the show). Retrieved October 22, 2005
 Friendly Giant - CBC Classics - CBC Days to Remember - CBC Archives. Retrieved October 22, 2005
 Friendly Giant dies after lengthy illness. Retrieved October 26, 2008
 TV Acres - The Friendly Giant. Retrieved October 22, 2005
 Obituary of Bob Homme and The Friendly Giant on TV Party.com. Retrieved October 22, 2005

1950s Canadian children's television series
1960s Canadian children's television series
1970s Canadian children's television series
1980s Canadian children's television series
1958 Canadian television series debuts
1985 Canadian television series endings
Black-and-white Canadian television shows
CBC Television original programming
Culture of Madison, Wisconsin
Canadian television shows featuring puppetry
Television shows filmed in Toronto
Works set in castles
Fiction about giants